Charlie Creed-Miles (born 24 March 1972) is an English actor and musician.

Creed-Miles was born in Nottingham, and had his first starring screen role, aged 21, in The Punk (1993). His brief relationship with actress Samantha Morton (with whom he co-starred in The Last Yellow) produced a daughter, Esmé Creed-Miles, born in 2000.

Filmography

Film

Television

Music 

 North of Ping Pong
 Fly Like an Eagle - Stereophonics *Kind'' (2019)

References

External links 
 
 Interview with Charlie Creed-Miles on Essex Boys Movie

1972 births
English male film actors
Living people
20th-century English male actors
21st-century English male actors
Male actors from Nottinghamshire
Actors from Nottingham